Gregory Martin Jones (born  February 12, 1948) is a former American football running back. He was drafted by the Minnesota Vikings in the fifth round of the 1970 NFL Draft. he played for the Buffalo Bills from 1970-1971. He played college football at UCLA.

External links
Pro-Football reference

1948 births
Living people
Players of American football from San Francisco
American football running backs
UCLA Bruins football players
Buffalo Bills players